Ban Mo is a district (amphoe) in the northwestern part of Saraburi province, central Thailand.

History
After the Buddha footprint near Saraburi was found and a temple was built, King Songtham hired Dutch engineers to build a road from Tha Ruea to Wat Phra Phutthabat to make the pilgrimage there easier. Elephants did the heavy lifting. When the elephants got sick, they were cured at Wat Khok (later called Wat Khok Ban Mo and Wat Ban Mo finally), which thus gave the district its name.

Geography
Neighboring districts are (from the west clockwise) Don Phut, Nong Don, Phra Phutthabat, Sao Hai of Saraburi Province, and Tha Ruea of Ayutthaya province.

Administration
The district is divided into nine sub-districts (tambons).

Transportation
Ban Mo accessible by Northern Railway, Ban Mo Railway Station is the only station of the district, it is middle between Tha Ruea (Ayutthaya) and Nong Don (Saraburi) Railway Stations.

Economy
Taro  is another important food crop.

References

Ban Mo